The 2016 Southampton City Council election took place on 5 May 2016 to elect members of Southampton City Council in England. This was on the same day as other local elections.

After the election, the composition of the council was:
Labour 25
Conservative 19 (-1)
Councillors Against Cuts 3 (+1)
Independent 1

Election result
Southampton Council is elected in thirds, which means all comparisons are to the corresponding 2012 Southampton Council election.

Ward results

Bargate

Bassett

Bevois

Bitterne

Bitterne Park

Coxford

Freemantle

Harefield

Millbrook

Peartree

Portswood

Redbridge

Shirley

Sholing

Swaythling

Woolston

References

2016 English local elections
2016
2010s in Southampton